= Trofeo Spagnolo =

- Founded: 1995
- Region: Genoa, Italy
- Teams: 2–3
- Current champions: (Italy) Genoa (11th title)
- Most championships: (Italy) Genoa (11 titles)

The Trofeo Spagnolo is a summer association football friendly tournament that takes place in Genoa, Italy, from 1995. The tournament is organized by Genoa C.F.C. in memoriam of Vincenzo Claudio Spagnolo, a Genoa fan that was murdered near where Genoa's match against Milan was being played, on 29 January 1995. The tournament was suspended in 2005 due to the unavailability Genoa's Stadio Luigi Ferraris and in 2011 because of the stadium being needed for a second round Coppa Italia match between Sampdoria and Alessandria. After 13 years of inactivity, the tournament resumed in the summer of 2026.

The teams played three round-robin matches that were each one half of 45 minutes. If any match ends in a draw, it's decided by a penalty shoot-out. Starting in 1998, the title was awarded to the winner of a single match at the Stadio Luigi Ferraris.

== Winners ==
Team	Times played	Titles won	Years
(Italy) Genoa	15	11	1995, 1996, 2000, 2001, 2003, 2004, 2006, 2007, 2008, 2010, 2012
(Italy) Torino	5	1	1999
(Italy) Internazionale	2	1	1998
(Italy) Bologna	1	1	1997
(Italy) Chievo	1	1	2002
(Spain) Deportivo	1	1	2026

== Editions ==
- Note: From 1995 to 1997, the standings were determined by a round-robin table.

Year	Champions	Result	Runners-up	Third place
1995	(Italy) Genoa	*	(England) Tottenham Hotspur	(Italy) Torino
1996	(Italy) Genoa	*	(Portugal) Sporting CP	(Italy) Torino
1997	(Italy) Bologna	*	(Italy) Genoa	(Italy) Fiorentina
1998	(Italy) Internazionale	4–2	(Italy) Genoa	–
1999	(Italy) Torino	2–0	(Italy) Genoa	–
2000	(Italy) Genoa	2–2 (7–6 pen.)	(Italy) Parma	-
2001	(Italy) Genoa	4–2	(Germany) Werder Bremen	–
2002	(Italy) Chievo	2–1	(Italy) Genoa	–
2003	(Italy) Genoa	1–0	(Italy) Catania	–
2004	(Italy) Genoa	1–0	(Italy) Internazionale	–
2005	Not held			
2006	(Italy) Genoa	1–0	(Italy) Torino	–
2007	(Italy) Genoa	4–4 (8–6 pen.)	(Italy) Torino	–
2008	(Italy) Genoa	3–1	(Netherlands) AZ	–
2009	Not held			
2010	(Italy) Genoa	1–0	(Spain) Athletic Bilbao	–
2011	Not held			
2012	(Italy) Genoa	0–0 (7–6 pen.)	(Turkey) Galatasaray	–
2013-2025	Not held			
2026	(Spain) Deportivo	1–0	(Italy) Genoa	–
